Armando José Domingo Jaramillo Lyon (8 November 1923 − 27 August 2002) was a Chilean politician who served as a member of the Senate of Chile. Similarly, he served as a member of the Chamber of Deputies of Chile.

From 1990 to 1994, he was the ambassador of Chile to Colombia. He was appointed in that charge by President Patricio Aylwin.

References

External links
 BCN Profile

1973 births
2002 deaths
Chilean people of English descent
University of Chile alumni
Liberal Party (Chile, 1849) politicians
National Party (Chile, 1966) politicians
Republican Party (Chile, 1982) politicians
Party for Democracy (Chile) politicians
Liberal Party (Chile, 1998) politicians